Yugar is a rural locality in the Moreton Bay Region, Queensland, Australia.

Geography
Yugar is in South East Queensland  from Brisbane.

History 
The locality takes its name from the Yugar railway station, which in turn was named on 12 January 1917 by the Queensland Railways Department, using a Yuggera language (Yugarabul dialect) word yugai referring to a type of fern.

Parker Provisional School opened on 15 August 1904. On 1 January 1909 it became Parker State School. It closed 9 March 1945. It was at 1826 Mount Samson Road. The name Parker refers to the name of the parish.

On Sunday 8 June 1913 Ernest Austin raped and murdered 11-year-old Ivy Alexandra Mitchell in bushland near the Parker State School. He was executed by hanging at Boggo Road Gaol on Monday 22 September 1913. He was the last person to be executed in Queensland.

The median age of the Yugar population was 43 years, 6 years above the national median of 37.  77.2% of people living in Yugar were born in Australia. The other top responses for country of birth were England 5.6%, New Zealand 5.1%, Thailand 1%, Malawi 1%, Kenya 1%.  92.6% of people spoke only English at home; the next most common languages were 1.3% Mandarin.

References

Further reading 

 

Suburbs of Moreton Bay Region
Localities in Queensland